Hewitsonia similis is a butterfly in the family Lycaenidae. It is found in Gabon and the Republic of the Congo.

References

Butterflies described in 1891
Poritiinae
Butterflies of Africa